Avtar Singh Atwal was a Deputy Inspector General in Punjab Police. He was murdered by a follower of Jarnail Singh Bhindranwale at the steps of Golden temple while coming out after prayers on 25 April 1983 His murder set in motion a chain of events that led to the commencement of the Operation Blue Star. He was a posthumous recipient of President's Police Medal for Gallantry.

Personal life
He was survived by his wife and son. His wife Amrita Atwal later joined the Punjab Civil Services and retired as an IAS officer. His son, Harbir Atwal, also joined the Punjab Police as an Inspector, currently serving as a SP.

Death
On 23 April 1983, while serving as the DIG of Police Jalandhar range, Atwal visited the Golden Temple to pray. While leaving the Darbar Sahib, he was shot and killed by a lone gunman. Two others were critically injured. The killing took place in broad daylight metres away from his bodyguards and official car. Immediately after the shootout, Atwal's bodyguard and car driver escaped in his car. A group of Punjab Armed Police jawans were stationed nearby but instead of nabbing the assassin, they also fled along with the crowd from the shooting spot. The militants from inside the temple came out to celebrate around Atwal's body and fired celebratory shots in the air. His corpse remained on the temple steps for several hours, and the Police force did not pick it up fearing further firings from the militants. Punjab CM Darbara Singh then telephoned Bhindranwale asking to allow the dead body to be picked up to which he agreed.

Aftermath
The "Top Cop" Atwal's killing shocked the entire state of Punjab. It established a fear of Bhindranwale's gunmen among the locals. The Sikhs sympathetic to the Akali movement were also appalled by the incident as they viewed it as offensive towards Golden Temple. Akali leaders had an emergency meeting to discuss the aftermath of the murder. Akali Dal such as like Harchand Singh Longowal and Gurcharan Singh Tohra immediately denounced the murder in clear terms on record. Meanwhile, Jarnail Singh Bhindranwale described the killing as "the handiwork of the Government to malign Sikhs".

Chief Minister of Punjab Darbara Singh advised Prime Minister of India Indira Gandhi to send Police force inside the Golden temple. The law and order situation in Punjab continued to deteriorate further and leading to the PM taking the decision of sending in army to assist the local law enforcement and to flush out the militants out of the temple in Operation Bluestar.

Published accounts

Documentary
Operation Blue Star and the assassination of Indira Gandhi (2013) is a TV documentary which premièred on ABP News Channel series, Pradhanmantri. This documentary directed by Puneet Sharma and narrated by Shekhar Kapur showed the circumstances of Atwal's murder.

See also 
 Achhar Singh Chhina
 Arjan Singh Mastana
 Baldev Singh Mann
 Darshan Singh Canadian
 Deepak Dhawan
 Gursharan Singh (theatre director)
 Jaimal Singh Padda
 Nidhan Singh Gudhan
 Pash
 Satyapal Dang
 Teja Singh Swatantar
 Punjab insurgency

References

External links 
Low Intensity Conflicts in India: An Analysis   

1943 births
1983 deaths
Indian Sikhs
Assassinated Indian people
People from Punjab, India
Punjabi people
Male murder victims
Victims of the insurgency in Punjab
People murdered in Punjab, India
Deaths by firearm in India
Indian Police Service officers
Assassinated police officers
Victims of Sikh terrorism
1983 murders in India